XHAGS-FM 103.1/XEAGS-AM 1070 is a combo radio station in Acapulco, Guerrero. It is owned by the Guilbot family and operated by Imagina Más Radio.

History
XEAGS received its first concession on November 24, 1992. Originally XEVMA-AM on 1430, it promptly became XEAGS-AM/XHAGS-FM, a full combo, and it moved to 1070 AM. The station was rechristened with the initials of its owner, Alberto Guilbot Serros. In 1999, Serros transferred the concession to its current concessionaire, which he owned. For a significant period of time, Grupo ACIR operated XEAGS/XHAGS as well as XHVILL-FM in Villahermosa, Tabasco.

The Amor format moved from XHMAR-FM 98.5 in early 2014. XHAGS had previously been Digital 103.1 with a pop format. Amor returned to XHMAR on August 4, 2020.

References

Grupo ACIR
Spanish-language radio stations
Radio stations in Guerrero
Radio stations established in 1992
1992 establishments in Mexico